The St. James Episcopal Church is an Episcopal church located at 111 N. Pearl St. in McLeansboro, Illinois. The Gothic Revival church was built in 1880–81. The brick church features a  bell tower and a steep gable roof. The walls of the church are supported by brick buttresses with stone caps. The church includes a variety of stained glass windows, including a rose window in the western gable, a round window above the altar, and a tall central window depicting Jesus as the Good Shepherd. The majority of the church's remaining windows are Gothic pointed arch windows.

The church was listed on the National Register of Historic Places on January 24, 1995.

Notes

External links
 St. James Episcopal Church - official site

Churches on the National Register of Historic Places in Illinois
Buildings and structures in Hamilton County, Illinois
Episcopal church buildings in Illinois
Gothic Revival church buildings in Illinois
Churches completed in 1881
National Register of Historic Places in Hamilton County, Illinois